Anthony Castro may refer to:

 Anthony Castro (baseball), professional baseball player
 Tony Castro, yacht designer